The Steve Allen Show was an American variety show hosted by Steve Allen from June 1956 to June 1960 on NBC, from September 1961 to December 1961 on ABC, and in first-run syndication from 1962 to 1964.

The first three seasons aired on Sunday nights at 8:00pm Eastern Time, directly opposite The Ed Sullivan Show. It moved to Mondays at 10:00pm Eastern in the 1959–60 season under the name The Steve Allen Plymouth Show (sponsored by Plymouth automobile). After a season's absence, the series briefly returned on Wednesdays at 7:30pm Eastern.

The syndicated version aired mostly in late nights. The program, between September 1957 and June 1960, became one of the first programs to be telecast in "compatible color". Kinescopes of the NBC version were later  edited into 104 half-hour episodes and rerun on the short-lived "HA!" channel and Comedy Central in the early 1990s, with new introductions by Allen.

Overview
The Steve Allen Show was the first in a series of prime time spin-offs from The Tonight Show, all of which were named after the host: Jack Paar (1957 to 1962) and Jay Leno (2009 to 2010) would follow in Allen's footsteps.

The show launched the careers of cast members Don Knotts, Tom Poston, Louis Nye, Pat Harrington, Jr., Tim Conway, Bill Dana, and, near the end of its run, Jim Nabors. The show's most popular sketch was the "Man on the street" which featured Knotts as the nervous Mr. Morrison (whose mannerisms Knotts would later use for Barney Fife on The Andy Griffith Show), Poston as the man who could not remember his own name, Harrington as Italian golf player Guido Panzini, Nye as the smug Gordon Hathaway, and Dana as José Jiménez. Hathaway's greeting of "Hi Ho Steverino!" became a catchphrase as did Jimenez's "My name José Jiménez." Dayton Allen also appeared in the sketch and spawned the catchphrase "Whyyyyy not?" Gabe Dell, previously a member of The Bowery Boys, was also a cast member. Gene Rayburn was the show's announcer and Skitch Henderson was the bandleader.

The Steve Allen Show also helped foster the careers of many musicians. Although Allen himself did not have much affection for rock and roll, the show featured numerous rock and roll artists in their earliest TV appearances. The show presented Elvis Presley, Fats Domino, Jerry Lee Lewis, Louis Jordan & The Tympany Five, The Treniers, The Collins Kids, and The Three Stooges. However, the rock 'n' roll stars often did not appear on the show as most fans would have desired. For instance, Allen presented Elvis Presley with a top hat and the white tie and tails of a "high class" musician while singing "Hound Dog" to an actual Basset Hound, who was similarly attired. Some have erroneously suggested that the "Hound Dog" performance was intentionally disrespectful, and emblematic of Allen's disdain for rock 'n' roll. In reality, Allen took a risk booking the controversial Presley, and the bit was orchestrated both for comedic effect, and to mitigate potential controversy. Indeed, Presley's label, RCA Victor (co-owned with NBC at the time), chose an image from a rehearsal of this performance to adorn the picture sleeve of the 45 rpm single of "Hound Dog", which had not yet been released at the time of the Allen appearance. That show drew the largest audience in the history of the Steve Allen Show, an estimated 40 million viewers garnering for NBC a 20.2 rating (against CBS's Sullivan's 14.8) as well  as  a 55.3% share vs Ed Sullivan's 39.7%

After being cancelled by NBC in 1960, the show returned in the fall of 1961 on ABC. Nye, Poston, Harrington, Dell, and Dayton Allen returned. New cast members were Joey Forman, Buck Henry, and newcomers Tim Conway (then known as Tom Conway) and The Smothers Brothers. Allen's wife, Jayne Meadows also joined the cast. The new version was cancelled after 14 episodes.

In 1967, after trying his hand at a syndicated talk show several years earlier, Allen briefly returned on CBS with most of his old regulars for The Steve Allen Comedy Hour, an eight-week summer replacement series on Wednesdays at 10:00pm Eastern (replacing the cancelled Danny Kaye Show). 21 minutes of the premiere episode featured one of Allen's favorite sketches, "The Prickly Heat Telethon", which Allen ran on film in its entirety at his 1973 Carnegie Hall concert. The short-lived series featured the debuts of Rob Reiner, Richard Dreyfuss, and John Byner, and featured Ruth Buzzi, who would become famous soon after as a regular on Rowan & Martin's Laugh-In.

Syndication
A syndicated version of The Steve Allen Show, known informally as the Westinghouse Show, ran, through Westinghouse Broadcasting, from June 1962 to October 1964. It was taped at what would later become known as The Steve Allen Playhouse in Hollywood. He competed against new Tonight host Johnny Carson. Original announcer Gene Rayburn and bandleader Skitch Henderson did not return to this version (Rayburn was by this time hosting The Match Game on NBC and Henderson opted to rejoin Tonight under Carson), instead being replaced by Johnny Jacobs as announcer and Donn Trenner as bandleader, respectively (in early 1964, Bill Daily succeeded Jacobs as Steve's announcer). Following a dispute with Westinghouse over creative control, Allen left the show in 1964 to take over hosting duties on I've Got a Secret, and a young Regis Philbin (who had worked for Allen dating back to Philbin's time as an NBC Page on Tonight in 1955) briefly took over the reins in its final weeks. The Trenner orchestra included some of the finest West Coast jazz musicians, among them guitarist Herb Ellis, trombonist-scat vocalist Frank Rosolino and saxophonist-trombonist Bob Enevoldsen.

The Allen Westinghouse Show is considered a classic of American late-night talk shows today, given its professed influence on a number of comedy greats including David Letterman, Robin Williams, Steve Martin, Harry Shearer and others impressed by its wild, anarchic style, complete with outdoor stunts staged near the Hollywood Ranch Market, not far from the studio. The show's guests included such Southern California eccentrics as health food enthusiast Gypsy Boots, popular TV physics professor Julius Sumner Miller, Miles Davis and his group (1964), Lenny Bruce, Peter Sellers, Jackie Vernon (in his first television appearance), and a young Frank Zappa, who appeared as a "musical bicyclist." A 1964 episode featured a roundtable discussion with historical figures in costume; this served as a demonstration episode for a new series Allen was proposing, Meeting of Minds, which would eventually go to series in 1977.

In April 1968, a year after I've Got a Secret ended its run, Allen returned to syndicated nightly variety-talk with another new series, this one distributed by Filmways. Although more conversational in tone than his previous entry, it did feature the same wacky stunts that would influence David Letterman in later years, including becoming a human hood ornament; jumping into vats of oatmeal and cottage cheese; and being slathered with dog food, allowing dogs backstage to feast on the free food. Allen also introduced Albert Brooks and Steve Martin for the first time to a national audience on the Filmways series, which ran until November 1969. After a hiatus of about 14 months, starting in early 1971, a mustachioed Allen returned to syndication for a short run.

Awards
The Steve Allen Show won a Peabody Award in 1958 for its "genuine humor and frank experiments" during a year when most shows were "conspicuously lacking" such elements.

Notes

External links
 

1956 American television series debuts
1964 American television series endings
1950s American variety television series
1960s American variety television series
American Broadcasting Company original programming
Black-and-white American television shows
English-language television shows
First-run syndicated television programs in the United States
NBC original programming
American live television series
1960s American late-night television series